The Golden Hockey Stick is an award given to the top Czech ice hockey player. It was originally awarded to the top player in the Czechoslovak First Ice Hockey League, beginning in the 1968–69 season. After the Czech Republic and Slovakia became separate countries in 1993, it was awarded to the top Czech player anywhere in the world.

Jaromír Jágr has won this award 12 times, more than any other player. Dominik Hašek and David Pastrňák have won it five times.

Winners (team in parentheses)

1969 Jan Suchý (HC Dukla Jihlava)
1970 Jan Suchý (Dukla Jihlava)
1971 František Pospíšil (HC Kladno)
1972 František Pospíšil
1973 Vladimír Martinec (HC Pardubice)
1974 Jiří Holeček (Sparta Prague)
1975 Vladimír Martinec (HC Pardubice)
1976 Vladimír Martinec (HC Pardubice)
1977 Milan Nový (HC Kladno)
1978 Ivan Hlinka (HC Litvínov)
1979 Vladimír Martinec (HC Pardubice)
1980 Peter Šťastný (HC Slovan Bratislava)
1981 Milan Nový (HC Kladno)
1982 Milan Nový (HC Kladno)
1983 Vincent Lukáč (HC Košice)
1984 Igor Liba (HC Dukla Jihlava)
1985 Jiří Králík (HC Gottwaldov)
1986 Vladimír Růžička (HC Litvínov)
1987 Dominik Hašek (HC Pardubice)
1988 Vladimír Růžička (HC Dukla Trenčín)
1989 Dominik Hašek (HC Pardubice)
1990 Dominik Hašek (HC Dukla Jihlava)
1991 Bedřich Ščerban (Dukla Jihlava)
1992 Róbert Švehla (HC Dukla Trenčín)
1993 Miloš Holaň (HC Vítkovice)
1994 Roman Turek (HC České Budějovice)
1995 Jaromír Jágr (Pittsburgh Penguins)
1996 Jaromír Jágr (Pittsburgh Penguins)
1997 Dominik Hašek (Buffalo Sabres)
1998 Dominik Hašek (Buffalo Sabres)
1999 Jaromír Jágr (Pittsburgh Penguins)
2000 Jaromír Jágr (Pittsburgh Penguins)
2001 Jiří Dopita (HC Vsetín)
2002 Jaromír Jágr (Washington Capitals)
2003 Milan Hejduk (Colorado Avalanche)
2004 Robert Lang (Detroit Red Wings)
2005 Jaromír Jágr (HC Kladno, Avangard Omsk)
2006 Jaromír Jágr (New York Rangers)
2007 Jaromír Jágr (New York Rangers)
2008 Jaromír Jágr (New York Rangers)
2009 Patrik Eliáš (New Jersey Devils)
2010 Tomáš Vokoun (Florida Panthers)
2011 Jaromír Jágr (Avangard Omsk)
2012 Patrik Eliáš (New Jersey Devils)
2013 David Krejčí (Boston Bruins)
2014 Jaromír Jágr (New Jersey Devils)
2015 Jakub Voráček (Philadelphia Flyers)
2016 Jaromír Jágr (Florida Panthers)
2017 David Pastrňák (Boston Bruins)
2018 David Pastrňák (Boston Bruins)
2019 David Pastrňák (Boston Bruins)
2020 David Pastrňák (Boston Bruins)
2021 David Pastrňák (Boston Bruins)
2022 Ondřej Palát (Tampa Bay Lightning)

Sources
 The Highest Competition in Czech Republic and Czechoslovakia

Czech
Ice hockey in Czechoslovakia
Czech ice hockey trophies and awards
Awards established in 1969
1969 establishments in Czechoslovakia